Arnold Lindeen (May 9, 1910 – January 1, 1990) was an American politician who served in the Iowa House of Representatives from the 83rd district from 1975 to 1979.

References

1910 births
1990 deaths
Republican Party members of the Iowa House of Representatives